The Boston Celtics are an American professional basketball team based in Boston. They play in the Atlantic Division of the Eastern Conference in the National Basketball Association (NBA). The team is owned by Wyc Grousbeck  with Brad Stevens as the general manager. Founded in 1946, their 17 NBA championships are the  tied for the most for any NBA franchise along with their long time rivals Los Angeles Lakers, and their eight consecutive NBA championships from 1959 to 1966 represent the longest consecutive championship winning streak of any major professional sports leagues in the United States and Canada to date. They play their home games in the TD Garden.

There have been 18 head coaches for the Boston Celtics franchise. The Celtics won their first NBA championship in the 1957 NBA Finals under the coaching of Red Auerbach. Auerbach is the franchise's all-time leader in the number of regular-season and playoff wins as a coach. Auerbach and Bill Fitch were included in the Top 10 Coaches in NBA history. Fitch was the 1979–80 NBA Coach of the Year and also led the Celtics to a championship in 1981. Auerbach led the Celtics to nine championships, in 1957, 1959, 1960, 1961, 1962, 1963, 1964, 1965, and 1966. He was also the 1965–66 Coach of the Year. K.C. Jones led the Celtics to two championships, in 1984 and 1986. Alvin Julian, Auerbach, Tom Heinsohn, Fitch and Rick Pitino have earned induction into the Basketball Hall of Fame as coaches.

Bill Russell, Tom Heinsohn, Tom Sanders, Dave Cowens, K.C. Jones, Chris Ford and M. L. Carr have played and coached for the Celtics. John Russell, Alvin Julian, Heinsohn, Sanders, Carr, and John Carroll spent their entire coaching career with the Celtics. Doc Rivers, led the team to one NBA championship.

Key

Coaches

Notes
A running total of the number of coaches of the Celtics. Thus, any coach who has two or more separate terms as head coach is only counted once.
Each year is linked to an article about that particular Celtics season.

References
General

Specific

Lists of National Basketball Association head coaches by team

Head coaches